The Great Carrot Train Robbery is a 1969 Warner Bros. Merrie Melodies cartoon directed by Robert McKimson. The short was released on January 25, 1969, and stars Bunny and Claude in their second and last short.

The short is the final "classic era" Warner Bros. cartoon with the voice of Mel Blanc.

References

External links

Merrie Melodies short films
1969 animated films
1969 short films
1969 films
Films scored by William Lava
1960s Warner Bros. animated short films
1960s English-language films
Animated films about trains